David Lindley (born 4 December 1956) is a British theoretical physicist and author. He holds a B.A. in theoretical physics from Cambridge University (1975–1978) and a PhD in astrophysics from the University of Sussex (1978–1981). Then he was a postdoctoral researcher at Cambridge University. From 1983 to 1986, he was a Research Fellow in the Theoretical Astrophysics Group at the Fermi National Accelerator Laboratory. He then served as Technical Editor and Writer with the Central Design Group for the Superconducting Supercollider at the Lawrence Berkeley Laboratory in Berkeley, California. He was an Associate Editor at Nature (1987–1993), a Senior Editor of Science (1994–1995), and an Associate Editor of Science News (1996–2000). Since 2000, he has been a freelance science writer and consultant.

Lindley is known for writing entertaining scientific texts that show not only great knowledge of physics, but also a wit and understanding of what the layman can grasp. Most of his books explain the scientific theories through the use of a scientist's biography or an historical account of disagreement amongst scientists.

In The End of Physics, Lindley challenged the assumption that string theorists might achieve a unified theory. He contended that particle physics was in danger of becoming a branch of aesthetics, since these theories could be validated only by subjective criteria, such as elegance and beauty, rather than through experimentation.

Selected books 

Where Does the Weirdness Go: Why Quantum Mechanics is Strange, But not as Strange as You Think, Basic Books (1996), ;

References

External links
 American Scientist Interview

British physicists
British science writers
1956 births
Living people
Alumni of the University of Sussex
Academic journal editors
Theoretical physicists